Tetrahydrocannabinol (THC) is the principal psychoactive constituent of cannabis and one of at least 113 total cannabinoids identified on the plant.  Although the chemical formula for THC (C21H30O2) describes multiple isomers, the term THC usually refers to the Delta-9-THC isomer with chemical name (−)-trans-Δ9-tetrahydrocannabinol. THC is a terpenoid found in cannabis and, like many pharmacologically active phytochemicals, it is assumed to be involved in the plant's evolutionary adaptation against insect predation, ultraviolet light, and environmental stress. THC was first discovered and isolated by Israeli chemist Raphael Mechoulam in Israel in 1964. It was found that, when smoked, THC is absorbed into the bloodstream and travels to the brain, attaching itself to endocannabinoid receptors located in the cerebral cortex, cerebellum, and basal ganglia. These are the parts of the brain responsible for thinking, memory, pleasure, coordination and movement.

THC, along with its double bond isomers and their stereoisomers, is one of only three cannabinoids scheduled by the UN Convention on Psychotropic Substances (the other two are dimethylheptylpyran and parahexyl). It was listed under Schedule I in 1971, but reclassified to Schedule II in 1991 following a recommendation from the WHO. Based on subsequent studies, the WHO has recommended the reclassification to the less-stringent Schedule III. Cannabis as a plant is scheduled by the Single Convention on Narcotic Drugs (Schedule I and IV). It is specifically still listed under Schedule I by US federal law under the Controlled Substances Act for having "no accepted medical use" and "lack of accepted safety". However, dronabinol, a pharmaceutical form of THC, has been approved by the FDA as an appetite stimulant for people with AIDS and an antiemetic for people receiving chemotherapy under the trade names Marinol and Syndros.

Medical uses

THC is an active ingredient in Nabiximols, a specific extract of Cannabis that was approved as a botanical drug in the United Kingdom in 2010 as a mouth spray for people with multiple sclerosis to alleviate neuropathic pain, spasticity, overactive bladder, and other symptoms. Nabiximols (as Sativex) is available as a prescription drug in Canada. In 2021, Nabiximols was approved for medical use in Ukraine.

As of 2022, 37 states, three territories, and the District of Columbia in the United States allow medical use of cannabis (in which THC is the primary psychoactive component), with the exception of Idaho, Iowa, Wyoming, Nebraska, Wisconsin, Indiana, Kentucky, Tennessee, Alabama, North Carolina, South Carolina, and Georgia. As of 2022, the U.S. federal government maintains cannabis as a schedule I controlled substance under law, while dronabinol is classified as Schedule III in capsule form (Marinol) and Schedule II in liquid oral form (Syndros).

Pharmacology

Mechanism of action 

The actions of Delta-9-THC result from its partial agonist activity at the cannabinoid receptor CB1 (Ki = 40.7 nM), located mainly in the central nervous system, and the CB2 receptor (Ki = 36 nM), mainly expressed in cells of the immune system. The psychoactive effects of THC are primarily mediated by the activation of (mostly Gi-coupled) cannabinoid receptors, which result in a decrease in the concentration of the second messenger molecule cAMP through inhibition of adenylate cyclase. The presence of these specialized cannabinoid receptors in the brain led researchers to the discovery of endocannabinoids, such as anandamide and 2-arachidonoyl glyceride (2-AG).

THC is a lipophilic molecule and may bind non-specifically to a variety of entities in the brain and body, such as adipose tissue (fat). THC, as well as other cannabinoids that contain a phenol group, possess mild antioxidant activity sufficient to protect neurons against oxidative stress, such as that produced by glutamate-induced excitotoxicity.

THC targets receptors in a manner far less selective than endocannabinoid molecules released during retrograde signaling, as the drug has a relatively low cannabinoid receptor affinity. THC is also limited in its efficacy compared to other cannabinoids due to its partial agonistic activity, as THC appears to result in greater downregulation of cannabinoid receptors than endocannabinoids. Furthermore, in populations of low cannabinoid receptor density, THC may even act to antagonize endogenous agonists that possess greater receptor efficacy. However while THC's pharmacodynamic tolerance may limit the maximal effects of certain drugs, evidence suggests that this tolerance mitigates undesirable effects, thus enhancing the drug's therapeutic window.

Recently, it has been shown that THC is also a partial autotaxin inhibitor, with an apparent IC50 of 407 ± 67 nM for the ATX-gamma isoform. THC was also co-crystallized with autotaxin, deciphering the binding interface of the complex. These results might explain some of the effects of THC on inflammation and neurological diseases, since autotaxin is responsible of LPA generation, a key lipid mediator involved in numerous diseases and physiological processes. However, clinical trials need to be performed in order to assess the importance of ATX inhibition by THC during medicinal cannabis consumption.

Pharmacokinetics 
THC is metabolized mainly to 11-OH-THC by the body. This metabolite is still psychoactive and is further oxidized to 11-nor-9-carboxy-THC (THC-COOH). In animals, more than 100 metabolites could be identified, but 11-OH-THC and THC-COOH are the dominating metabolites. Metabolism occurs mainly in the liver by cytochrome P450 enzymes CYP2C9, CYP2C19, CYP2D6, and CYP3A4. More than 55% of THC is excreted in the feces and ≈20% in the urine. The main metabolite in urine is the ester of glucuronic acid and 11-OH-THC and free THC-COOH. In the feces, mainly 11-OH-THC was detected.

Physical and chemical properties

Discovery and structure identification
Cannabidiol was isolated and identified from Cannabis sativa in 1940, and THC was isolated and its structure elucidated by synthesis in 1964.

Solubility
As with many aromatic terpenoids, THC has a very low solubility in water, but good solubility in lipids and most organic solvents, specifically hydrocarbons and alcohols.

Unknown lethal dose
The median lethal dose of THC in humans is not fully known as there is conflicting evidence. A 1972 study gave up to 9000 mg/kg of THC to dogs and monkeys without any lethal effects. Some rats died within 72 hours after a dose of up to 3600 mg/kg.

A 2014 study gave the median lethal dose in humans at 30 mg/kg (2.1 grams THC for a person who weighs 70 kg), observing cardiovascular death in otherwise healthy subjects. A different 1972 study gave the median lethal dose for intravenous THC in mice and rats at 30–40 mg/kg.

Total synthesis
A total synthesis of the compound was reported in 1965; that procedure called for the intramolecular alkyl lithium attack on a starting carbonyl to form the fused rings, and a tosyl chloride mediated formation of the ether.

Biosynthesis 
In the Cannabis plant, THC occurs mainly as tetrahydrocannabinolic acid (THCA, 2-COOH-THC). Geranyl pyrophosphate and olivetolic acid react, catalysed by an enzyme to produce cannabigerolic acid, which is cyclized by the enzyme THC acid synthase to give THCA. Over time, or when heated, THCA is decarboxylated, producing THC. The pathway for THCA biosynthesis is similar to that which produces the bitter acid humulone in hops. It can also be produced in genetically modified yeast.

History 

THC was first isolated and elucidated in 1969 by Raphael Mechoulam and Yechiel Gaoni at the Weizmann Institute of Science in Israel.

In 2003, the World Health Organization Expert Committee on Drug Dependence recommended transferring THC to Schedule IV of the Convention, citing its medical uses and low abuse and addiction potential.

Hemp-derived and experimental cannabinoids 
The Agriculture Improvement Act of 2018 has been interpreted as allowing any hemp-derived product not exceeding 0.3% Δ9-THC to be sold legally in the US. Since the law counted only Δ9-THC, Δ8-THC, Δ10-THC, 11-Hydroxy-Δ8-THC, Δ7-THC, along with many other non-synthetic cannabinoids are considered legal to sell under the farm bill and are widely available online. Many substances are, however, scheduled at the state level under various synonyms owing to the different dibenzopyran and monoterpenoid naming conventions. Delta-1, Delta-6, and Delta 3,4-Tetrahydrocannabinol are alternative names for Delta-9, Delta-8, and Delta-6a10a Tetrahydrocannabinol, respectively. 

In the 2020s, concerns were raised over THC-O-acetate, a potent synthetic homologue and a cannabinoid known to exhibit hallucinogenic effects that have been described as 300% more potent than THC. THC-O is a Schedule I controlled substance which has not been in many completed long term scientific trials, rousing claims that it, and most other modern cannabinoids could have unseen consequences mentally or physically.

Ketene gas is potentially lethal at 5 parts per million

Society and culture

Comparisons with medical cannabis 

Female cannabis plants contain at least 113 cannabinoids, including cannabidiol (CBD), thought to be the major anticonvulsant that helps people with multiple sclerosis, and cannabichromene (CBC), an anti-inflammatory which may contribute to the pain-killing effect of cannabis.

Drug Testing

THC and its 11-OH-THC and THC-COOH metabolites can be detected and quantified in blood, urine, hair, oral fluid or sweat using a combination of immunoassay and chromatographic techniques as part of a drug use testing program or in a forensic investigation.  There is ongoing research to create devices capable of detecting THC in breath.

Regulation in Canada
As of October 2018 when recreational use of cannabis was legalized in Canada, some 220 dietary supplements and 19 veterinary health products containing not more than 10 parts per million of THC extract were approved with general health claims for treating minor conditions.

Research
The status of THC as an illegal drug in most countries imposes restrictions on research material supply and funding, such as in the United States where the National Institute on Drug Abuse and Drug Enforcement Administration continue to control the sole federally-legal source of cannabis for researchers.  Despite an August 2016 announcement that licenses would be provided to growers for supplies of medical marijuana, no such licenses were ever issued, despite dozens of applications. Although cannabis is legalized for medical uses in more than half of the states of the United States, no products have been approved for federal commerce by the Food and Drug Administration, a status that limits cultivation, manufacture, distribution, clinical research, and therapeutic applications.

In April 2014, the American Academy of Neurology found evidence supporting the effectiveness of the cannabis extracts in treating certain symptoms of multiple sclerosis and pain, but there was insufficient evidence to determine effectiveness for treating several other neurological diseases. A 2015 review confirmed that medical marijuana was effective for treating spasticity and chronic pain, but caused numerous short-lasting adverse events, such as dizziness.

Multiple sclerosis symptoms
 Spasticity. Based on the results of 3 high quality trials and 5 of lower quality, oral cannabis extract was rated as effective, and THC as probably effective, for improving people's subjective experience of spasticity. Oral cannabis extract and THC both were rated as possibly effective for improving objective measures of spasticity.
 Centrally mediated pain and painful spasms.  Based on the results of 4 high quality trials and 4 low quality trials, oral cannabis extract was rated as effective, and THC as probably effective in treating central pain and painful spasms.
 Bladder dysfunction. Based on a single high quality study, oral cannabis extract and THC were rated as probably ineffective for controlling bladder complaints in multiple sclerosis

Neurodegenerative disorders
 Huntington disease. No reliable conclusion could be drawn regarding the effectiveness of THC or oral cannabis extract in treating the symptoms of Huntington disease as the available trials were too small to reliably detect any difference
 Parkinson's disease.  Based on a single study, oral CBD extract was rated probably ineffective in treating levodopa-induced dyskinesia in Parkinson's disease.
 Alzheimer's disease. A 2009 Cochrane Review found insufficient evidence to conclude whether cannabis products have any utility in the treatment of Alzheimer's disease.

Other neurological disorders
 Tourette syndrome. The available data was determined to be insufficient to allow reliable conclusions to be drawn regarding the effectiveness of oral cannabis extract or THC in controlling tics.
 Cervical dystonia. Insufficient data was available to assess the effectiveness of oral cannabis extract of THC in treating cervical dystonia.

Potential for toxicity
Preliminary research indicates that prolonged exposure to high doses of THC may interfere with chromosomal stability, which may be hereditary as a factor affecting cell instability and cancer risk. The carcinogenicity of THC in the studied populations of so-called "heavy users" remains dubious due to various confounding variables, most significantly concurrent tobacco use.

See also 

 Cannabinoid hyperemesis syndrome (CHS)
 Cannabinoids
 11-Hydroxy-THC, metabolite of THC
 Anandamide, 2-Arachidonoylglycerol, endogenous cannabinoid agonists
 Cannabidiol (CBD)
 Cannabinol (CBN), a metabolite of THC
 Delta-7-Tetrahydrocannabinol, a synthetic isomer of THC
 Delta-8-Tetrahydrocannabinol, a double bond isomer of THC
 Delta-10-Tetrahydrocannabinol, a positional isomer of THC
 THC-O-acetate, the acetate ester of THC.
 Dimethylheptylpyran
 Dronabinol, the name of THC-based pharmaceutical (INN)
 HU-210, WIN 55,212-2, JWH-133, synthetic cannabinoid agonists (neocannabinoids)
 Nabilone, a novel synthetic cannabinoid analog (neocannabinoid)
 Parahexyl
 Tetrahydrocannabinolic acid (THCA), the biosynthetic precursor for THC
 Tetrahydrocannabiphorol, the heptyl homologue
 List of investigational analgesics
 Medical cannabis
 Dronabinol
 Epidiolex (prescription form of purified cannabidiol derived from hemp used for treating some rare neurological diseases)
 Sativex
 Effects of cannabis
 Vaping-associated pulmonary injury
 War on Drugs

References

External links 
 U.S. National Library of Medicine: Drug Information Portal – Tetrahydrocannabinol

 
Acetylcholinesterase inhibitors
Amorphous solids
Antiemetics
Appetite stimulants
Aromatase inhibitors
Benzochromenes
CB1 receptor agonists
CB2 receptor agonists
Entheogens
Euphoriants
Glycine receptor agonists
Natural phenols metabolism
Cannabis
Phytocannabinoids